The Austrian Cup, known as UNIQA ÖFB Cup for sponsorship purposes, is an annual football competition held by the Austrian Football Association, the ÖFB. During the 2008–09 season, Austria Wien won the tournament for 27th time, a record. Red Bull Salzburg are the current holders, winning the 2021-2022 tournament, making it their 8th successive win in the tournament and their 9th overall.

History

It has been held since 1918–19, with the exception of the time of the Anschluss between 1939 and 1945 and the period between 1950 and 1958 when the competition was deemed of little interest. Because Austria co-hosted Euro 2008, only teams from Austrian Football First League (Austrian Second League) or lower divisions took part in the 2007–08 Austrian Cup.

Until 2010, the tournament was named after its main sponsor (the latest being the Austrian brewery Stiegl). Since then, the tournament has been held under the motto "Goals for Europe" ("Tore für Europa") to emphasize that it is the fastest way for Austrian teams to qualify for the UEFA Europa League (6–7 games, depending on the division of the club).

Having won the cup 27 times, Austria Wien is by far the most successful competitor. The current holder of the trophy is FC Red Bull Salzburg.

Austro-Hungarian Challenge Cup Finals

Austrian Cup Finals

Notes:
  Only teams from Austrian Football First League (Austrian Second League) or lower divisions played due to lack of time because of the Euro 2008 in Austria & Switzerland.

Performance

Performance by club

Notes:
  All teams are defunct clubs from Innsbruck, Tirol. Wacker Innsbruck (1915–1999), Swarovski Tirol (1986–1992) and Tirol Innsbruck (1993–2002). They are considered to be the continuation of the each other.
  The Red Bull company bought the club on 6 April 2005 and rebranded it. Prior 2005 the team was known as SV Austria Salzburg or Casino Salzburg. They also changed the colours from white-violet in red-white. The Violet-Whites ultimately formed a new club, SV Austria Salzburg.
 * FC Admira Wacker Mödling was formed after the merger of SK Admira Wien and SC Wacker Wien in 1971, under the name of Admira Wacker Wien, the merge with VfB Mödling in 1997 and the merge with SK Schwadorf in 2008. The new team play in Mödling.

See also
Austrian Football Bundesliga
List of Austrian football champions
Austrian Supercup

References

External links

  League321.com - National cup results.
 Austria - List of Cup Finals, RSSSF.com
 Austrian Cup summary - Soccerway

 
C
Austria
1918 establishments in Austria
Recurring sporting events established in 1918